Tetrix sierrane is a species of grasshopper in the family Tetrigidae. It is endemic to the United States.

References

sierrane
Endemic fauna of the United States
Insects described in 1956
Taxonomy articles created by Polbot
Taxobox binomials not recognized by IUCN